Dobrich is the 9th most populated city in Bulgaria, the administrative centre of Dobrich Province and the capital of the region of Southern Dobrudzha. It is located in the northeastern part of the country, 30 km west of the Bulgarian Black Sea Coast, not far from resorts such as Albena, Balchik, and Golden Sands. In January 2012, Dobrich was inhabited by 79,269 people within the city limits. The city is named after the Bulgarian medieval lord of the surrounding region - Dobrotitsa. Agriculture is the most developed branch of the economy.

Dobrich Knoll on Livingston Island in the South Shetland Islands, Antarctica is named after Dobrich. A point of interest is the Dobrich TV Tower.

Etymology

The city is named after the 14th-century Dobrujan ruler Dobrotitsa, from the Slavic root dobr, "good".

The city has had several name changes throughout its history. When the town was founded in the 16th century during the Ottoman period, it bore the name Hacıoğlu Pazarcık after the Turkish travelling merchant who established the settlement, and to distinguish it from the larger town of Pazarcık (today Pazardzhik).

After the autonomous Bulgarian state was established, the citizens of the town voted to change the name to Dobrich on 19 February 1882. When Romania annexed Southern Dobruja in 1913 after the Second Balkan War, the city was known as Bazargic, the Romanian variant of its earlier Turkish name.

On 25 September 1940, per the Treaty of Craiova, the city reverted to Bulgarian rule and "Dobrich" was once again in use. In 1949 during the Communist era the city was renamed Tolbukhin in honour of Soviet Marshal Fyodor Tolbukhin. Finally, after the end of the Zhivkov regime, the name of the city was changed back to "Dobrich" by presidential decree on 19 September 1990.

History 
The first evidence of settlement in what is now Dobrich dates from the 4th or 3rd century BC. Under the Latin name Abrittum, it was a city of the Roman province of Moesia Inferior, important enough to become a suffragan bishopric of the Metropolitan of the capital, Marcianopolis, but the Catholic diocese faded later. Ruins from 2nd to 4th centuries AD and the 7th to 11th centuries have also been found, including a Bulgar necropolis featuring pagan graves in the centre of the city.

During the 11th century, Pecheneg invasions devastated the interior of Dobruja, leaving many settlements in the region uninhabited at the time of the Second Bulgarian Empire.

The settlement was founded for a second time in the 16th century by the Turkish merchant Hacıoğlu Pazarcık, whose name it bore until 1882. According to Ottoman data from 1646–1650, there were over 1,000 houses in the city, about 100 shops, three inns, three Turkish baths, twelve mosques and twelve schools. From the 17th to the 19th century, the city developed as a handicraft, trade and agricultural centre, being famous for its weaving, homespun tailoring, coppersmith's trade, leather-work and agricultural products, such as wheat, linseed, wool and cheese. At the beginning of the 19th century, the city's population reached 12,000, many of whom refugees from eastern Bulgaria after the Russo-Turkish Wars. The cultural appearance of the city was also formed. The first Orthodox church was built in 1843. The city was liberated from the Ottoman Empire on 27 January 1878 and renamed Dobrich on 19 February 1882.

After the Treaty of Bucharest of 1913 (confirmed by the Treaty of Neuilly of 1919), Dobrich and the whole of Southern Dobruja were incorporated in Romania for a period until 1940. During that time, the city bore the name Bazargic, which is a transformation of the earlier Turkish name Hacıoğlu Pazarcık, and was centre of Caliacra County (județ in Romanian). On 25 September 1940, the Bulgarian army marched into the city after signing Treaty of Craiova on September 7, 1940; date celebrated as the city's holiday, later changed to September 25.

In 1949, during the period of Communist rule, Dobrich was renamed Tolbukhin (Толбухин) after Marshal of the Soviet Union Fyodor Tolbukhin. On 19 September 1990, a presidential decree restored the city's old name of Dobrich. Despite the renewing of the name Dobrich architecturally maintains an ex-communist outlook even in the 21st century. The vehicle registration plate code for the region has also remained unchanged; it is the abbreviation TX (from ТолбуХин; Тolbukhin).

Geography
Dobrich is located in the northeastern part of the country, 30 km west of the Bulgarian Black Sea Coast, not far from resorts such as Albena, Balchik, and Golden Sands.

Climate

Ecology

Air 
In the municipality of Dobrich, the quality of atmospheric air is monitored by the mobile station for emission control of the Regional Inspectorate for the Environment and Water Resources (RIEWR) - Varna. The station is equipped with automatic monitoring devices measuring the quantities of carbon oxide, ozone, nitrogen oxides, sulfuric dioxide, and fine dust particles.
The municipality is implementing a program for decreasing the quantities of dust particles, which was adopted by the municipal council in 2003.

Water resources 
Surface water resources are insufficient in the region, with often water shortages. The town is supplied with water from drill wells and water catchment areas located near the town. Eight pumping stations provide bacteria-free drinking water which does not need further treatment. The water sources are in constant operation. A security area surrounds each source, and the water distribution is controlled by computers. The municipality boasts a complete water supply network.

Green areas 

The municipal Green System Plan examines the status of the existing urban and suburban green areas, as well as the variety of the plant species. The Green System includes the following categories of green areas: public parks and gardens, special parks and gardens, sanitary/protective greening, transportation greening (streets and roads), and limited-usage greening.

Economy

Today Dobrich is a modern industrial-agricultural and transport center of the Dobrudzha region, one of the ten largest cities in Bulgaria - an important cultural, economic and administrative center in the northeastern economic region of the country. The economic profile of Dobrich is determined by the food industry, which provides over 50% of the volume of urban industry, as well as light industry. The rich agricultural area provides valuable raw materials.

The specific features of the region are a prerequisite for the development of agriculture as one of the priority sectors in the economy of the district. Dobrich produces high quality products, which are processed on site and are competitive on both domestic and foreign markets. The arable agricultural land in the territory of the municipality is 7700 ha. The main crops are wheat, corn, sunflower. The structure-determining branch in the municipality is the food industry. The share in the national scale in the production of dairy products, bread and confectionery, oil and margarine, wines and spirits is solid. The city hosts the largest agricultural exhibition in the country, "Agriculture and everything about it." A significant share of the city's economy is occupied by light industry with the production of men's and women's clothing, furniture, fabrics, leather, jacquard products.

The extremely favorable combination of natural and climatic conditions in the region are a real prerequisite for the high level of agricultural development. It has always been and is now also one of the priority sectors in the district's economy. Apart from being the center of a large agricultural region, the municipality of Dobrich has a well-formed industrial complex. The city has developed the branches of the food industry / production of dairy products, sausages, pasta, wines and spirits, soft drinks; poultry meat products, flour, bread and confectionery /, light industry / production of men's and women's clothing, leather clothing, furniture and footwear /, mechanical engineering / production of batteries, machinery and equipment for milk processing, semi-trailers and containers, agricultural machinery , radiators and filters for cars and trucks, plastic products /, construction / construction of buildings and facilities, design, civil and industrial construction /. Another form of trade development is the organization of annual fairs and exhibitions on a national and international scale, such as "Agriculture and everything about it", "National Exchange for Seeds and Seedlings", "Beekeeping", "Trade, wines and delicacies" , "Made in Bulgaria", as the role of "Dobrich Fair" AD is essential for their successful implementation.

Agriculture

Agriculture is the most developed branch of the economy. The main reason for this is the environment – climate, soils and clean lands. 81% of all the land in Dobrich is agricultural, almost 4,000,000 decares. More than 70% of it is cultivated, which makes Dobrich №1 cultivated region in the country. Farming, plant-growing and stock-breeding are the most important part of the economy in Dobrich. Dobrudja territory, called the “granary of Bulgaria” is part of the district. Some of the end products made in Dobrich are: bread and flour products, all kinds of sausages, milk and dairy products, poultry products, margarine and vegetable oils, wine, soft drinks.
The biggest bird-farm is located in the district. Other factories of great importance are the milk factory (one of the biggest factories in Bulgaria), the bread factory (one of the biggest factories in Bulgaria). Additional important products from other industries are cement, electric appliances, clothes, confection, furniture, car batteries, containers and there are many other factories from the food and beverage industry.

Gasification
The municipal strategy provides that the household, utility and industrial sectors be supplied with gas under a project for gasification. The network of gas pipelines has been extended to 43,808 metres. Currently we are working on the gasification of the residential areas. All municipal establishments from the educational, administrative, healthcare and social service sectors have already been covered by the gas supply network.

Communications
Dobrich has six offices for postal services. They cover the whole territory of the town thus meeting the needs of the community. The municipality of Dobrich is wired by two local landline telecommunication networks which operate four analogue and one digital exchanges.

Population 
As of the 2021 Census, Dobrich is inhabited by 79,269 people within the city limits. The number of the residents of the city (not the municipality) reached its peak in the period 1986-1991 when exceeded 110,000. The following table presents the change of the population after 1887.

Ethnic and religious composition
According to the latest 2011 census data, the individuals declared their ethnic identity were distributed as follows:
Bulgarians: 73,657 (87.5%)
Turks: 6,795 (8.1%)
Roma: 2,482 (2.9%)
Others: 528 (0.6%)
Indefinable: 708 (0.8%)
Undeclared: 6,860 (7.5%)
Total: 91,030

The percentage of Orthodox Christians, according to the 2001 census data, is 86%, whereas around 10% of the population are adherents of the Muslim faith.

Church "St. George"

The church is the oldest church from the Revival period in Dobrich. It is located in the center of the town, in the immediate vicinity of the Ethnographic house. The building is a cultural heritage site. It was built in 1864, on the spot of an older Christian church from 1843 that burned down during the Crimean War, together with the lower Bulgarian neighborhood.

In an architectural sense, the new church is a three-nave basilica. It was built with the donations of the Bulgarian population in Dobrich and the Dobrich district, in the courtyard of the great Bulgarian Revival figure Ivan Hadzhi Valkov. It is assumed that the church was made by unknown craftsmen who belonged or at least were familiar with the school of the famous Bulgarian master Kolyu Ficheto. The frescoes inside are made by Kozma Blazhenov, a representative of the Debar Art School, who also made the engraved iconostasis. The icons were painted by painters famous at the time – Nedko Todorovic from Zheravna, Haralambi Todorov from Pirdop and Nikolay Vasilev from Shumen. The church was consecrated in 1889 by Bishop Simeon.

“Holy Trinity” Church

The “Holy Trinity” church is located in the center of Dobrich. The older church building that was situated at this place was built in 1859, to the left of the entrance of today’s church. It was later joined by the first school in the town, where the mutual instruction approach was used.  The present church was built in 1911. Architecturally speaking, it is a classic three-nave basilica, a dome and a bell tower. The icons of its iconostasis were painted by Gospodin Zhelyazkov, a student of Repin.

Armenian Church “Saint Hovhaness”

It was built in 1894, replacing an old temple from 1830. It was designed by Italian architects. It is a one-nave church with stone foundations and walls and a wooden roof. In the temple you can see original images of Armenian saints painted in the 19th century.

Towns and villages
The Municipality of Dobrich has a special status - the territory of the municipality holds only the town of Dobrich with a population of 91030 people.
Transport system
The road and communication network provides access to all parts of the region and to other regions in Bulgaria. Rail provides convenient and cheap travel to the capital city, the Black Sea coast, and to some European countries.
Street network
The street network has been expanded according to the detailed urban development plans and the particulars of the terrain. A ring road regulates the direct and the outgoing traffic to Varna, Albena, Balchik, General Toshevo, Silistra, Shumen and Russe. The street network of the town (total length 165 km, of which 60 km main streets) takes the incoming and the internal traffic.

Culture

Places of interest

The City Park St. George 

The City Park St. George or the city garden as known among people of Dobrich is the most visited place in Dobrich by its citizens and guests. In the far year of 1867 Bildieto (the City Municipal Council) selects a place in the neighborhood of Karabokluka for establishment of the first city garden. An enormous contribution for development of the city-park art has the family of Gradinarovi. Its area is 430 dca and is divided into several sectors – “The Old Garden”, Children’s sector – a zone for games and fun, park lakes zone, zone of rock terrace gardens, sports zone etc. In 1999 the old garden of the city park is announced to be a monument of culture and garden park art.
The park is located immediately next to the central pedestrian zone in Dobrich. The park is one of the five oldest city parks in the country. It covers – the old garden, declared to be a cultural heritage site, a children's area, lakes, terraced rock gardens and a sports area. Even today the visitors can see some plant species imported from Europe at the beginning of the last century. The park hosts also one on the town museums, with a separate room for temporary and visiting exhibitions.

Nature and Animal Protection Centre 

The centre is the only one of its kind not only in Bulgaria but also in Eastern Europe. Founded under a Bulgarian-Swiss project, it boasts an area of 16 hectares, 50-year-old vegetation (trees and bushes), and a convenient access.
The zoo houses over 40 animal species - deer, roe, raccoon, alpaca, llamas, mouflons, goats, Przhevalski's horses, brown bears, bison, pheasants, storks, pelicans exotic and water birds, turtles, etc. - which live in conditions very close to their natural habitats.
A priority for the zoo is the reproduction and re-introduction of endangered animal species.

Dobrich TV Tower 

Dobrich TV Tower houses broadcasting equipment for radio, television and telecommunications. It is 146 metres tall and built of reinforced concrete. The tower, which was designed by Petar Andreev, was completed in 1979 and has an observation deck open for tourists. It is also remarkable by its design.

Social institutions

Education 
The activities of the Department of "Education and Culture" in secondary education are conducted in accordance with the requirements of the Education Act, the regulations implementing the Education Act and are consistent with the educational policy of Dobrich Municipality. Educational policy in general considers socio-economic characteristics of modern society as well as prospects for future development. In this sense today it is important to reconsider the capacity of Bulgarian schools to respond to the new challenges adequately.

The existing school network in the city sufficiently meets the interests of young people as well as the needs of economy.
At this stage the territorial model meets the need of accessibility. There is a secondary school in each sub region of the city, which is near the students' place of residence. This allows free and compulsory education for all.
The manager's office, "Humanitarian Activities" - Section "Education and Culture" Dobrich, is the specialized authority for management of municipal kindergartens and schools. It is located at:
Dobrich, st. "Nezvisimost"  7
Neicho Neychev - Head of "Education and Culture"

At the beginning of 2013/2014, the education network in the city of Dobrich includes 17 kindergartens, 7 elementary schools, 5 middle schools, 3 specialized schools,  7 vocational schools, a sport school, a subsidiary school, 2 private schools, student dormitories, a dormitory and Municipal Youth Center "Zahari Stoyanov".

The number of pupils in primary schools is 2362 and the number of classes 107.

In 5 secondary schools, a sports schools and 3 specialized high schools ar trained 6090 students in 265 classes. Profile subjects in the schools: Humanities, Sciences, Foreign Language and Technology. Profile subjects such as Music, Art and Sport are also available to choose.

From the approved state plan for the admission of pupils on completion of seventh grade in local schools, including 16 classes were implemented 16. After completing basic education are formed 5 classes.

In market conditions vocational education in municipality is held in 7 vocational schools located in different areas of the city. During the school year 2013/2014 1598 students are trained in 26 majors and professions in 73 classes. Each professional school has its own building and facilities for practical training. Private schools in the territory of Dobrich are 2 with a total of 95 students in 16 classes.

Distance Learning Centre of Technical University - Varna
Programmes: Management, Industrial management, Business administration.

University of Shumen ‘Ep. K. Preslavski'- College in Dobrich
Programmes: Pre-school pedagogics and foreign languages, Primary school pedagogics and foreign languages, Design and technology, Art, Information technology, Library operations, Farming (specialization in agricultural economics and rural tourism), Public administration, Public Relations, Tourism.

Dobrich University of Management
Programmes: Marketing and management of the hospitality industry, Marketing and management, Agricultural economics, Hotel management, International business and management.

There are about 30 high schools, 19 kindergartens and 3 mangers in Dobrich.

Sport 
FC Dobrudzha 1919
Volleyball Club Dobrudzha 07
Handball Club Dobrudzha
Boxing Club Dobrotitsa
Wrestling Club

Notable people from Dobrich
Ahmed III, Ottoman Sultan during the Tulip period, who was born in Dobrich at the year 1673.
Dora Gabe, poet
Dimitar Spisarevski, fighter pilot
Adriana Budevska, actress
Boncho Genchev, football player, 4th in the 1994 FIFA World Cup with the Bulgarian national team
 Boris Nikolov, boxer, the first Bulgarian ever to win a medal at the Olympics
Preslava, pop-folk singer
Miro, singer, under the real name of Miroslav Kostadinov
Nikolay Kostov (born 2 July 1963) is a Bulgarian football manager and former footballer who manages Bulgarian side Botev Plovdiv
Marica Pitu, aromanian folk singer 
Avguste Antonov, pianist. Official website
Kadriye Nurmambet, tatar folk singer, lawyer

Twin towns - sister cities
Dobrich is twinned with:

 Białystok, Poland 
 Golmud, China
 Izmail, Ukraine
 Kavadarci, North Macedonia
 Kırklareli, Turkey
 Pinsk, Belarus
 Saratov, Russia
 Schaffhausen, Switzerland
 Zalaegerszeg, Hungary

Gallery

References

External links 

 The modern website of Dobrich 
 Info Dobrich 
 City of Dobrich
 The official site of Municipality Dobrich 
 A guide to Dobrich  
 Dobrich Information and Photos

 Ethnographic complex Old Dobrich 

 
Populated places in Dobrich Province
Capitals of former Romanian counties